Jacob Francis Huhn (August 6, 1919 – February 15, 1977) was a Canadian politician. He served in the Legislative Assembly of British Columbia from 1960 to 1966, as a Social Credit member for the constituency of North Peace River. He died in 1977.

References

British Columbia Social Credit Party MLAs
1919 births
1977 deaths